A Gust of Wind is a 1942 German musical film directed by Walter Felsenstein and starring Paul Kemp, Margit Debar and Elsa Wagner. It was based on an Italian play by Giovacchino Forzano. A man gets shut out of his apartment in his nightshirt by a gust of wind. His neighbours refuse to believe this is the real reason. The film marked the screen debut of Sonja Ziemann who went on to become a leading star of the 1950s.

Main cast
 Paul Kemp as Emanuele Rigattieri
 Margit Debar as Angelina Seri
 Elsa Wagner as Frau Brigoni
 Sonja Ziemann as Gina Galassi
 Franz Schafheitlin as Gerichtsvorsitzender
 Heinrich Troxbömker as Portier
 Ursula Herking as Teresina Bonfanti
 Lina Carstens as Frau Galassi

References

Bibliography

External links 
 

1942 films
Films of Nazi Germany
German musical comedy films
1942 musical comedy films
1940s German-language films
Tobis Film films
German black-and-white films
1940s German films